John Herbst may refer to:

 John E. Herbst (born 1952), American diplomat
 John C. "Pappy" Herbst (1909–1946), American flying ace

See also 
 Johan Herbst